Communication Workers Union may mean:

Communication Workers Union of Australia
Communication Workers' Union (Ireland)
Communication Workers' Union (Italy)
Communication Workers Union (South Africa)
Communication Workers Union (Trinidad and Tobago)
Communication Workers Union (United Kingdom)
Communication Workers of America
Communications Workers' Union (Ghana)